"Only the Young" is a song recorded by American singer-songwriter Taylor Swift, not to be confused with the identically-named song written, performed, produced, and released by the rock band Journey. It was released on January 31, 2020, through Republic Records, as a promotional single for Miss Americana, a 2020 Netflix documentary on Swift. In the film's closing credits, the song is featured. Held back from being included on Swift's seventh studio album, Lover (2019), the song was both written and produced by Swift and Joel Little, inspired by the 2018 United States elections.

The song is a synth-pop tune and features backing vocals from Little's daughters. As a protest song, "Only the Young" discusses subjects such as school shootings, Donald Trump, and vote-tampering concerns in its lyrics. Upon release, music critics praised Swift's lyricism on United States politics, addressing matters such as gun violence and mass shootings. Some critics have noted it as Swift's most politically-charged song yet.

"Only the Young" won the People's Choice Award for the Best Soundtrack Song of 2020. The song entered the charts in several countries worldwide, reaching the top 20 in Scotland and the Netherlands, top 40 in Australia, Hungary, and Ireland, as well as the top 50 in Belgium and the US. It debuted at number one on the Billboard Digital Song Sales, becoming Swift's record-extending nineteenth number-one song on the chart. The song was used in a video advertisement for the Biden/Harris campaign in the 2020 United States presidential election and trended during the 2022 Philippine presidential election.

Background and release
In an interview with Chris Willman of Variety, Swift revealed that she held back "Only the Young" from being included on her seventh studio album Lover (2019). She also revealed that the song is both co-written and co-produced with Joel Little, who worked with Swift on four songs for the album including "Miss Americana & the Heartbreak Prince", from which the title of the documentary comes, Swift further said that the song is not intended to be single, but a song for her 2020 Netflix documentary, Miss Americana. Little added the song was the last he and Swift worked on during a week in New York City, following "The Man" and "Me!", and that his two daughters contributed backing vocals to the song. Swift released "Only the Young" on January 31, 2020, as a promotional single. She wrote the song after the 2018 United States elections. Prior to the elections, Swift broke her political silence by endorsing two Democrats: Congressman Jim Cooper for re-election to the House of Representatives, and former Tennessee governor Phil Bredesen for the Senate. Swift also criticized the voting record of Bredesen's opponent Republican Marsha Blackburn.

Composition

"Only the Young" has been described as a "synth-pop tribute to the next generation of political activists." Swift's vocal range in the song spans between E3 to B4. The song is written in the key of F-flat major and has a moderately fast tempo of 94 beats per minute. "Only the Young" incorporates political lyrics, in contrast to Swift's earlier works that were politically neutral. Swift urges young citizens to get involved in politics if they want things to change. She does this by alluding to 2017–2021 US, President Donald Trump, the 2016 presidential election, the succeeding vote tampering allegations, and issues like gun violence and school shootings in the United States. Willman termed the song as "an anthem for millennials who might've come away disillusioned with the political process".

Critical reception
Entertainment Weekly writer Lauren Huff dubbed "Only the Young" a "political anthem" with lyrics aimed at American youth. Billboards Gil Kaufman called the song an "urgent, clear-eyed" tune that sees Swift "giving voice to her disillusionment about our stuck society". He described the theme as "a sad concession and a defiant warning" to older generations on how "their greed and failure to act has given rise to a youth movement determined to turn the page". Vultures Zoey Haylock found the song to be urging the listeners to "get out there and participate in democracy", and added that it exudes Swift's faith in the American youth.

Rolling Stone writer Claire Shaffer wrote that the song documents the singer's "recent political awakening" as seen in Miss Americana. Stereogums James Rettig opined that the song finds Swift "reckoning with the current political climate and her place in it". Writing for Taste of Country, Jacklyn Krol commented that the song could be Swift's most politically charged song yet. Slates Chloe Hadavas compared the lyrics of "Only the Young" to those of Swift's other politically-charged songs: "The Man" (2019) and "Miss Americana & the Heartbreak Prince" (2019), adding that it is the latest addition to her "budding canon of protest songs", that focuses "less on feminist and queer issues than on the cause of rallying younger generations". Papers Jael Goldfine defined the song as the musical accompaniment to Swift's "newly radicalized political identity"—"the Democrat-voting, Dixie Chicks-defending, nice-girl-no-more that she crafts in Miss Americana". Cosmopolitans Starr Bowenbank also labelled the song as Swift's most political song to-date. Nylons Layla Halabian termed the song a hopeful anthem "over a shimmering pop production", encouraging the youth to "challenge the establishment and secure a safer future".

Accolades 
Empire critics Ella Kemp and Ben Travis listed "Only the Young" as one of the best soundtrack songs of 2020. Michael Ordoña, writing for Los Angeles Times, listed "Only the Young" as one of 2021's Oscar-contending songs, remarking that it underscores Swift's status as a "significant cultural figure", evolving from her former "sugar-pop queen" image. Ordoña described the song as an "unabashedly political-while-still-catchy earworm".

Commercial performance
In the United States, buoyed by 30,000 sales in its first week, "Only the Young" debuted at number one on the Billboard Digital Song Sales chart, becoming Swift's record-extending 19th number-one song on the chart. The song also debuted at number 50 on the Billboard Hot 100 chart, becoming her ninety-seventh Hot 100 entry. In New Zealand, it peaked at number two on the Official New Zealand Hot Singles chart. Elsewhere, "Only the Young" reached numbers 13, 20, 31 and 40 on Scottish Singles, the Netherlands' Single Tip, Australia's ARIA Singles and Irish Singles, respectively. In May 2022, the song debuted at number 23 on the Billboard Philippines Songs chart, following the results of the 2022 Philippine presidential election.

Usage in media

"Only the Young" was soundtracked in an advertisement as a part of Democratic campaigns in 2020 United States presidential elections. Californian representative Eric Swalwell revealed that Swift allowed the usage of the song for the Biden/Harris campaign free-of-cost, marking the first time Swift has lent her music to be used in a political advertisement.

The video advertisement was released on October 30, 2020. It opens with a quote from Vice Presidential candidate, Kamala Harris, wondering why "so many powerful people are making it so difficult to vote". The rest of the video features a montage of "chaotic and hopeful" scenes from the past four years in the US: Clips of Me Too and Black Lives Matter protesters, President Trump removing his face mask following a hospitalization for COVID-19, Judge Amy Coney Barrett being sworn in as a Supreme Court justice, a 75-year-old protester in Buffalo being pushed to the ground by police, and a scene of young voters and supporters of Democratic Presidential nominee (and eventual winner) Joe Biden organizing and taking part in early voting. The lyrics "And the big bad man and his big bad clan / Their hands are stained with red / Oh, how quickly, they forget" are timed to play over photos of Trump, Senators Mitch McConnell and Lindsey Graham, and Attorney General Bill Barr. The video ends with the motto: "You've marched for four years. Now it's time to run", and many popular hashtags, including #MeToo, #ICantBreathe, #WearAMask, #BidenHarris2020, #SaveUSPS and #Vote. Harris responded with thanks to Swift, and added that the singer is showing the American youth "what's at stake" in the election.

On November 6, 2020, South Korean channel JTBC used "Only the Young" as its closing song for the day's JTBC Newsroom—the evening newscast on the channel.

The song has also been widely used in the 2022 Philippine presidential election campaign of the 14th Vice President and Liberal Party presidential candidate, Leni Robredo.

Credits and personnel
Credits adapted from Tidal.

 Taylor Swift – vocals, songwriter, producer
 Joel Little – producer, songwriter, programmer, recording engineer, keyboards
 Emmie Little – backing vocals
 Lila Little – backing vocals
 Serban Ghenea – mixer
 John Hanes – mix engineer
 John Rooney – assistant recording engineer

Charts

Release history

See also
 List of Billboard Digital Song Sales number ones of 2020

References

2020 songs
Taylor Swift songs
Songs written by Taylor Swift
Songs written by Joel Little
Song recordings produced by Taylor Swift
Song recordings produced by Joel Little
Protest songs
Republic Records singles